Herb Prus III - is a Polish coat of arms. It was used by several szlachta families in the times of the Polish–Lithuanian Commonwealth.

The son of Prince of Prussia (which the Christian faith has passed, and married an only child, a daughter Maslausa, his coat of arms of Prussia, two deadly scythe given them) while his married the heiress of a great fortune coat of arms  Pobóg  (for God) - (Kasper Niesiecki binds Pobóg arms with the arms Zagłoba directly and indirectly with hawkweed), his coat of arms Prus II, as and father did, half a horseshoe in handy. Then, when a descendant of the Sobor, valiantly in the war lost the starting leg, King Boleslaw sent him a reward and on the helmet, not the hand but the golden leg armed, to commemorate the bravery of his, wear allowed. This herb is also called Nagody, it means that for God or weddings, a variety of coat of arms was created.

Shield in pole split in the right red - wolf silver knife blade down toward the center rotated in the left blue - half of silver horseshoe nailed to a one and a half gold cross, the lower arm to the right, the jewel foot armed with a spur, in knee bent, foot to the left.

Notable bearers
Notable bearers of this coat of arms include:

 Stanisław Jan Jabłonowski
 Antoni Barnaba Jabłonowski
 Anna Jabłonowska
 Krzemiński

External links 
  Prus 3rd Coat of Arms and bearers

See also
 Prus coat of arms
 Prus II Wilczekosy coat of arms
 List of Polish nobility coats of arms images
 Polish heraldry
 Heraldry

References
 Szymański, Józef Herbarz średniowiecznego rycerstwa polskiego,  Warszawa 1993
 Bobrowicz, Jan Nepomucen Herbarz polski Kaspra Niesieckiego S.J. powiększony dodatkami z późniejszych autorów, rękopisów, dowodów urzędowych, Tom I, Lipsk 1839-1846
 Chwalibińska, Jadwiga Ród Prusów w wiekach średnich, Toruń 1948

Prus III